Luvsjön is a lake in Katrineholm, Södermanland, Sweden.

Lakes of Södermanland County